Philema Branch (sometimes called Philema Creek) is a stream in the U.S. state of Georgia. It is a tributary to Flint River.

The stream was named after Chief Fullemy (or Philema) of the Chiaha tribe. A variant name is Beaverdam Creek.

References

Rivers of Georgia (U.S. state)
Rivers of Lee County, Georgia